The 2011 World Judo Championships were held at the Palais Omnisports de Paris-Bercy in Paris, France from 23 to 28 August.

Schedule

Medal summary

Men's events

Women's events

Medal table

Participating nations
871 competitors from 132 nations compete.

 (12)
 (1)
 (3)
 (3)
 (5)
 (4)
 (14)
 (5)
 (10)
 (2)
 (3)
 (6)
 (2)
 (3)
 (1)
 (19)
 (5)
 (3)
 (11)
 (11)
 (4)
 (2)
 (22)
 (3)
 (8)
 (2)
 (3)
 (15)
 (1)
 (2)
 (6)
 (2)
 (2)
 (2)
 (3)
 (4)
 (2)
 (5)
 (2)
 (3)
 (5)
 (28)
 (1)
 (13)
 (19)
 (4)
 (6)
 (1)
 (2)
 (7)
 (1)
 (3)
 (13)
 (11)
 (4)
 (1)
 (2)
 (9)
 (14)
 (28)
 (24)
 (3)
 (2)
 (10)
 (1)
 (6)
 (4)
 (9)
 (2)
 (4)
 (2)
 (2)
 (2)
 (4)
 (3)
 (8)
 (9)
 (3)
 (1)
 (23)
 (13)
 (7)
 (1)
 (14)
 (2)
 (4)
 (5)
 (9)
 (2)
 (2)
 (1)
 (2)
 (2)
 (2)
 (4)
 (2)
 (13)
 (7)
 (3)
 (8)
 (28)
 (2)
 (2)
 (8)
 (7)
 (3)
 (3)
 (8)
 (2)
 (2)
 (27)
 (2)
 (13)
 (7)
 (4)
 (6)
 (8)
 (2)
 (3)
 (11)
 (13)
 (22)
 (2)
 (15)
 (1)
 (25)
 (15)
 (2)
 (8)
 (4)
 (2)
 (2)

References

External links
 
 Results

 
World Judo Championships
World Championships
World Championships
Judo World Championships
World
Judo World Championships
Judo World Championships
Judo World Championships
Judo World Championships